Conus salletae is a species of sea snail, a marine gastropod mollusc in the family Conidae, the cone snails, cone shells or cones.

These snails are predatory and venomous. They are capable of "stinging" humans.

Description
The size of the shell varies between 14 mm and 24 mm.

Distribution
This marine species occurs off Boa Vista Island, Cape Verde.

References

 Puillandre N., Duda T.F., Meyer C., Olivera B.M. & Bouchet P. (2015). One, four or 100 genera? A new classification of the cone snails. Journal of Molluscan Studies. 81: 1-23

 

salletae
Gastropods described in 2014
Gastropods of Cape Verde
Fauna of Boa Vista, Cape Verde